The 26th season of Taniec z gwiazdami, the Polish edition of Dancing with the Stars is set to begin in late 2022 29, August 2022. 31 October 2022  This will be the thirteenth season aired on Polsat. For the second time the show will be aired on Mondays. Iwona Pavlović, Michał Malitowski, Andrzej Grabowski and Andrzej Piaseczny will return as judges. Krzysztof Ibisz, Paulina Sykut-Jeżyna and Izabela Janachowska will reprise their role as hosts.

On 6 July 2022, it was announced that model Jacek Jelonek would feature in the first same-sex couple.

Sylwia Madeńska and Robert Rowiński returned to the series as a pro. Michał Danilczuk, Roman Osadchiy, Dominik Rudnicki-Sipajło and Julia Suryś joined the pros.

Couples

Scores

Red numbers indicate the lowest score for each week.
Green numbers indicate the highest score for each week.
 indicates the couple eliminated that week.
 indicates the returning couple that finished in the bottom two or three.
 indicates the couple saved from elimination by immunity.
 indicates the winning couple.
 indicates the runner-up.
 indicates the couple in third place.
 indicates the couple withdrew from the competition.

Average score chart
This table only counts for dances scored on a 40-points scale.

Highest and lowest scoring performances 
The best and worst performances in each dance according to the judges' 40-point scale:

Couples' highest and lowest scoring dances

According to the 40-point scale:

Weekly scores
Unless indicated otherwise, individual judges scores in the charts below (given in parentheses) are listed in this order from left to right: Andrzej Piaseczny, Iwona Pavlović, Michał Malitowski and Andrzej Grabowski.

Week 1: Season Premiere
Running order

Week 2

Running order

Week 3: Krzysztof Krawczyk Week

Running order

Week 4: Hometown Glory

Running order

Week 5: Polsat's 30th Anniversary

Running order

Week 6: Dirty Dancing Week

Running order

Week 7: Trio Challenge

Running order

Week 8: You Decide!

Running order

Week 9: Trio Challenge (Semi-final)
Running order

Dance-off

Running order

Week 10: Season Final

Running order

Other Dances

Dance chart  
The celebrities and professional partners danced one of these routines for each corresponding week:
Week 1 (Season Premiere): Samba, Tango, Cha-cha-cha, Salsa, Charleston, Viennese Waltz, Jive, Waltz
Week 2: One unlearned dance (introducing Paso Doble, Contemporary, Quickstep)
Week 3 (Krzysztof Krawczyk Week): One unlearned dance (introducing Rumba)
Week 4 (Hometown Glory): One unlearned dance (introducing Foxtrot) and Team Dance
Week 5 (Polsat's 30th Anniversary): One unlearned dance (introducing Swing) and Jive Marathon
Week 6 (Dirty Dancing Week): A group Salsa, one unlearned dance (introducing Rock and Roll) and dance-offs 
Week 7 (Trio Challenge): One unlearned dance (introducing Twist) and one repeated dance
Week 8 (You Decide!): One unlearned dance and one repeated dance
Week 9 (Semi-final: Trio Challenge): One unlearned dance, one repeated dance and dance-offs
Week 10 (Season Final): One unlearned dance, one repeated dance (rivals' choice) and Freestyle

 Highest scoring dance
 Lowest scoring dance
 Performed, but not scored
 Bonus points
 Not performed due to withdrawal
 Gained bonus points for winning this dance-off
 Gained no bonus points for losing this dance-off

Guest performances

Rating figures

References

Season 26